The men's shot put event at the 1998 Commonwealth Games was held on 21 September in Kuala Lumpur.

Results

References

Shot
1998